Raymond Cecil Anderson (June 6, 1929 – October 24, 2003) was a Canadian international affairs consultant and former diplomat. He was High Commissioner to Australia, Papua New Guinea, Solomon Islands, and Vanuatu.

Born in Wetaskiwin, Alberta, Anderson studied at the University of Alberta, graduating with a Bachelor of Arts degree in 1952 and a Bachelor of Laws degree in 1957. He served with the Royal Canadian Air Force before joining the civil service in 1957, as a member of the Trade and Commerce division of the Department of Industry, Trade & Commerce. He served in various diplomatic postings in Brazil, the Philippines and the United States.

References

External links
 Foreign Affairs and International Trade Canada Complete List of Posts 

1929 births
University of Alberta alumni
Members of the United Church of Canada
2003 deaths
High Commissioners of Canada to Papua New Guinea
High Commissioners of Canada to the Solomon Islands
High Commissioners of Canada to Vanuatu
High Commissioners of Canada to Australia